Tim Harkness (born April 2, 1955) is an American football coach and former player. He served as the head football coach at Johnson C. Smith University in Charlotte, North Carolina from 1999 to 2004, compiling a record of 10–50.

References

1955 births
Living people
American football centers
American football offensive guards
Baylor Bears football coaches
Georgia Tech Yellow Jackets football coaches
South Carolina Gamecocks football coaches
Johnson C. Smith Golden Bulls football coaches
Johnson C. Smith Golden Bulls football players
Tampa Bay Buccaneers coaches
People from Columbia, South Carolina
Players of American football from South Carolina